A.J. Eisenberg Airport  is a public use airport located three nautical miles (6 km) southwest of the central business district of Oak Harbor, a city in Island County, Washington, United States. It is privately owned by A.J. Eisenberg Airport LLC. It was formerly known as Wes Lupien Airport and owned by Air International LLC. The airport previously had scheduled passenger service provided by Kenmore Air, which ceased operations to Oak Harbor on December 31, 2008. It was also served by Harbor Airlines, which had its hub at the airport from 1971 to 2001.

Although most U.S. airports use the same three-letter location identifier for the FAA and IATA, this airport is assigned OKH by the FAA and ODW by the IATA (which assigned OKH to RAF Cottesmore in Oakham, Rutland, England).

Facilities and aircraft 
It has one runway designated 7/25 with an asphalt surface measuring 3,265 by 25 feet (995 x 8 m).

As of July 20, 2009 A J Eisenberg Airport of Oak Harbor, WA is selling 100LL avfuel and 92 octane ethanol-free motor gas.

For the 12-month period ending May 30, 2009, the airport had 16,224 aircraft operations, an average of 44 per day: 99% general aviation and 1% air taxi. At that time there were 24 aircraft based at this airport: 87.5% single-engine and 12.5% multi-engine.

References

External links 
 A.J. Eisenberg Airport, listing in WSDOT directory
  from Washington State DOT Airport Directory
 Aerial photo as of 10 July 1990 from USGS The National Map
 

Airports in Washington (state)
Transportation buildings and structures in Island County, Washington